Evgenia Petrovna Antipova (19 October 1917 – 27 January 2009) was a Russian Soviet painter, watercolorist, graphic artist, and Art teacher, a member of the Saint Petersburg Union of Artists (before 1992 the Leningrad branch of Union of Artists of Russian Federation), lived and worked in Leningrad – Saint Petersburg and regarded as one of representatives of the Leningrad School of Painting.

Biography 
Evgenia Petrovna Antipova was born on 19 October 1917 in Toropets town, Pskov Governorate. Her father was a railway office worker. Since 1928 she lived with her parents in Samara on the Volga River. There she began to get busy in an artistic studio under the direction of Pavel Krasnov. From 1935, Antipova lived in Leningrad. In 1936–1939 she studied in the Leningrad Secondary Art School at the All-Russian Academy of Arts. Her teachers were Leonid Ovsyannikov, Alexander Zaytsev, Leonid Sholokhov, Alexander Debler, Vladimir Gorb.

In 1939 Antipova entered the painting department of the Repin Institute of Painting, Sculpture and Architecture (since 1944 named after Ilia Repin), where she studied with Semion Abugov, Genrikh Pavlovsky, Alexander Osmerkin, Gleb Savinov, and Vladimir Malagis. In 1939 Antipova at first participated in the All-Union Youth Artistic Exhibition in Moscow, presenting the sketch of work «Valery Chkalov among young people». It was printed in an art magazine «Young Artist» for 1939.

The start of Operation Barbarossa found Antipova on summer practice in the West Ukraine. With the last echelons she reached Leningrad. On 28 July 1941 Antipova made a match for Jacov Lukash, a fourth-year student of the department of monumental painting. Called up to serve in the Red Army, he perished at the front in May 1942. Up to the beginning of 1942, Antipova remained in blockaded Leningrad. In February 1942, she was evacuated to Novosibirsk, where she lived and worked up to the end of the war.

In 1945 Antipova returned to Leningrad and in 1950 graduated from the Repin Institute of Arts in Boris Ioganson's personal art studio (the former studio of Alexander Osmerkin). Her graduate work was a painting named «Andrey Zhdanov visits the Palace of Young Pioneers in Leningrad».

Creativity 

In 1950–1956 Antipova taught painting and composition in Tavricheskaya Art School in Leningrad. Since 1950 she participated in art exhibitions. In 1953 she was accepted in the members of Leningrad Union of Artists. Antipova painted genre and decorative compositions, portraits, landscapes, still life paintings, worked in oils and watercolours. Among her favorite themes and motives were a blossoming apple orchard, a Crimean landscape, a still life in the interior and in the exterior.

Among the known paintings of 1950th and the beginning of 1960th «Practical exercises» (1953), «Gurzuf in the morning», «A Sea is in Gurzufe» (both 1954), «Still life» (1957), «On a Summer Residence» (1958), «At the Peter and Paul Fortress», «Taffies», «Wild Flower Bouquet» (all 1960), «Apple tree» (1962), «Early breakfast» (1963), and «A Girl in the garden» (1964). They give an idea of the range of possibilities and direction of the creative searches of this artist. Antipova gravitated to expression of her individual attitude in themes, not applying on the exhaustive scope of the phenomenas of the life.

In 1960th Antipova tries herself in the series of portraits. Most considerable she has been «A Girl from Pereslavl» and «Waitress» (both 1964). From the end of 1960th leading genres in creation of Antipova were still life in an interior and exterior, and also landscape. The prevailing style of painting is distinguished by several conventional drawings and compositions, the interest for the transmission of color and light and air. Among the most known works of this period are «City courtyard in Gavan», «Sonth Still Life», «Grape Arbor», «Romantic landscape», «A Window. Nasturtiums» (all 1968), «Olives-trees» (1969), «Tulips on a window» (1970), «Pine-trees», «On the Vasilievskiy island» (both 1973), «Still life in the garden. A Spring» (1974), «Still life with Cornflowers and bread» (1975), «Balcony» (1977), «Still life with a Red Bottle» (1979), «Sunny Day» (1982), «Still life with a Spanish Jug» (1985), «Bird cherry tree in flower» (1989), and «Blooming Little Apple-tree» (1997). In the still lifes, Antipova increasingly prefers the open composition, placing a table with a bouquet of flowers, or a book in a corner of the garden, among the branches of a blossoming apple or cherry. Her best works of this genre – «A Midday» (1982), «Still Life. Flowering willow, Calla lilies, Daffodils» (1984) – are seen as images of the perfect world in which man finds harmony with nature and in his soul. This is the main theme of her art she continued until her death.

Evgenia Antipova had the personal exhibitions in Leningrad — Saint Petersburg in 1967, 1988, 1999 (all together with her husband, an artist Victor Teterin), and in 2007. In 1989–1992 paintings by Antipova successfully exhibited at the fine art auctions and the exhibitions of Russian paintings L 'École de Leningrad in France. She died on January 27, 2009, in the city of Saint Petersburg, ninety-one years old. Her paintings reside in the State Russian Museum, and in many art museums and private collections in Russia, France, Germany, USA, England and other countries.

See also 

A Midday (painting)
 Fine Art of Leningrad
Leningrad School of Painting
List of Russian artists
List of 20th-century Russian painters
List of painters of Saint Petersburg Union of Artists
Saint Petersburg Union of Artists

References

Exhibitions 

1954 (Leningrad): The Spring Exhibition of works by Leningrad artists of 1954, with Evgenia Antipova, Nikolai Baskakov, Sergei Frolov, Nikolai Galakhov, Vladimir Gorb, Maya Kopitseva, Boris Korneev, Elena Kostenko, Anna Kostrova, Gevork Kotiantz, Valeria Larina, Boris Lavrenko, Ivan Lavsky, Gavriil Malish, Alexei Mozhaev, Nikolai Mukho, Samuil Nevelshtein, Yuri Neprintsev, Sergei Osipov, Lev Russov, Ivan Savenko, Vladimir Seleznev, Arseny Semionov, Alexander Shmidt, Elena Skuin, Victor Teterin, Nikolai Timkov, Mikhail Tkachev, Leonid Tkachenko, Vecheslav Zagonek, and other important Leningrad artists.
1957 (Leningrad): 1917–1957. Leningrad Artist's works of Art Exhibition, with Evgenia Antipova, Vsevolod Bazhenov, Irina Baldina, Nikolai Baskakov, Piotr Belousov, Piotr Buchkin, Zlata Bizova, Vladimir Chekalov, Sergei Frolov, Nikolai Galakhov, Abram Grushko, Alexei Eriomin, Mikhail Kaneev, Engels Kozlov, Tatiana Kopnina, Maya Kopitseva, Boris Korneev, Alexander Koroviakov, Nikolai Kostrov, Anna Kostrova, Gevork Kotiantz, Yaroslav Krestovsky, Boris Lavrenko, Ivan Lavsky, Oleg Lomakin, Dmitry Maevsky, Gavriil Malish, Alexei Mozhaev, Evsey Moiseenko, Nikolai Mukho, Mikhail Natarevich, Samuil Nevelshtein, Dmitry Oboznenko, Lev Orekhov, Sergei Osipov, Vladimir Ovchinnikov, Nikolai Pozdneev, Alexander Pushnin, Lev Russov, Galina Rumiantseva, Ivan Savenko, Gleb Savinov, Alexander Samokhvalov, Arseny Semionov, Alexander Mikhailovich Semionov, Boris Shamanov, Alexander Shmidt, Nadezhda Shteinmiller, Galina Smirnova, Ivan Sorokin, Victor Teterin, Mikhail Tkachev, Leonid Tkachenko, Yuri Tulin, Ivan Varichev, Nina Veselova, Rostislav Vovkushevsky, Anatoli Vasiliev, Lazar Yazgur, Vecheslav Zagonek, Ruben Zakharian, Sergei Zakharov, Maria Zubreeva, and other important Leningrad artists.
1960 (Leningrad): Exhibition of works by Leningrad artists of 1960, with Piotr Alberti, Evgenia Antipova, Taisia Afonina, Genrikh Bagrov, Vsevolod Bazhenov, Nikolai Baskakov, Zlata Bizova, Nikolai Galakhov, Vladimir Gorb, Abram Grushko, German Yegoshin, Alexei Eriomin, Mikhail Kaneev, Mikhail Kozell, Marina Kozlovskaya, Boris Korneev, Alexander Koroviakov, Elena Kostenko, Nikolai Kostrov, Anna Kostrova, Gevork Kotiantz, Yaroslav Krestovsky, Boris Lavrenko, Ivan Lavsky, Oleg Lomakin, Dmitry Maevsky, Alexei Mozhaev, Evsey Moiseenko, Nikolai Mukho, Andrey Milnikov, Piotr Nazarov, Vera Nazina, Mikhail Natarevich, Samuil Nevelshtein, Dmitry Oboznenko, Sergei Osipov, Nikolai Pozdneev, Maria Rudnitskaya, Vladimir Sakson, Alexander Samokhvalov, Alexander Semionov, Arseny Semionov, Yuri Shablikin, Boris Shamanov, Alexander Shmidt, Elena Skuin, Alexander Sokolov, Alexander Stolbov, Victor Teterin, Nikolai Timkov, Yuri Tulin, Ivan Varichev, Rostislav Vovkushevsky, Vecheslav Zagonek, Ruben Zakharian, and other important Leningrad artists.
1960 (Leningrad): Exhibition of works by Leningrad artists of 1960, with Piotr Alberti, Evgenia Antipova, Taisia Afonina, Genrikh Bagrov, Vsevolod Bazhenov, Irina Baldina, Nikolai Baskakov, Yuri Belov, Piotr Belousov, Piotr Buchkin, Zlata Bizova, Vladimir Chekalov, Sergei Frolov, Nikolai Galakhov, Vladimir Gorb, Elena Gorokhova, Abram Grushko, German Yegoshin, Alexei Eriomin, Mikhail Kaneev, Engels Kozlov, Marina Kozlovskaya, Tatiana Kopnina, Maya Kopitseva, Boris Korneev, Alexander Koroviakov, Elena Kostenko, Nikolai Kostrov, Anna Kostrova, Gevork Kotiantz, Vladimir Krantz, Yaroslav Krestovsky, Valeria Larina, Boris Lavrenko, Ivan Lavsky, Piotr Litvinsky, Oleg Lomakin, Dmitry Maevsky, Gavriil Malish, Nikita Medovikov, Evsey Moiseenko, Nikolai Mukho, Andrey Milnikov, Vera Nazina, Mikhail Natarevich, Anatoli Nenartovich, Samuil Nevelshtein, Dmitry Oboznenko, Vladimir Ovchinnikov, Vecheslav Ovchinnikov, Sergei Osipov, Nikolai Pozdneev, Alexander Pushnin, Lev Russov, Galina Rumiantseva, Maria Rudnitskaya, Ivan Savenko, Vladimir Sakson, Gleb Savinov, Alexander Samokhvalov, Alexander Semionov, Arseny Semionov, Yuri Shablikin, Boris Shamanov, Alexander Shmidt, Nadezhda Shteinmiller, Elena Skuin, Galina Smirnova, Alexander Sokolov, Alexander Stolbov, Victor Teterin, Nikolai Timkov, Mikhail Tkachev, Leonid Tkachenko, Mikhail Trufanov, Yuri Tulin, Ivan Varichev, Anatoli Vasiliev, Valery Vatenin, Nina Veselova, Rostislav Vovkushevsky, Vecheslav Zagonek, Sergei Zakharov, Ruben Zakharian, and other important Leningrad artists.
1961 (Leningrad): Exhibition of works by Leningrad artists of 1961, with Piotr Alberti, Evgenia Antipova, Taisia Afonina, Vsevolod Bazhenov, Irina Baldina, Nikolai Baskakov, Yuri Belov, Piotr Belousov, Piotr Buchkin, Zlata Bizova, Nikolai Galakhov, Elena Gorokhova, Abram Grushko, Alexei Eriomin, Mikhail Kaneev, Mikhail Kozell, Engels Kozlov, Marina Kozlovskaya, Maya Kopitseva, Boris Korneev, Elena Kostenko, Anna Kostrova, Gevork Kotiantz, Yaroslav Krestovsky, Valeria Larina, Boris Lavrenko, Ivan Lavsky, Oleg Lomakin, Dmitry Maevsky, Gavriil Malish, Nikita Medovikov, Evsey Moiseenko, Alexei Mozhaev, Nikolai Mukho, Vera Nazina, Mikhail Natarevich, Anatoli Nenartovich, Samuil Nevelshtein, Yuri Neprintsev, Dmitry Oboznenko, Sergei Osipov, Vladimir Ovchinnikov, Nikolai Pozdneev, Alexander Pushnin, Galina Rumiantseva, Lev Russov, Maria Rudnitskaya, Ivan Savenko, Gleb Savinov, Vladimir Sakson, Alexander Samokhvalov, Vladimir Seleznev, Arseny Semionov, Alexander Semionov, Yuri Shablikin, Boris Shamanov, Alexander Shmidt, Nadezhda Shteinmiller, Elena Skuin, Galina Smirnova, Alexander Sokolov, Alexander Stolbov, Victor Teterin, Nikolai Timkov, Leonid Tkachenko, Mikhail Trufanov, Yuri Tulin, Ivan Varichev, Anatoli Vasiliev, Piotr Vasiliev, Valery Vatenin, Lazar Yazgur, Vecheslav Zagonek, Sergei Zakharov, Maria Zubreeva, and other important Leningrad artists.
1962 (Leningrad): The Fall Exhibition of works by Leningrad artists of 1962, with Piotr Alberti, Evgenia Antipova, Taisia Afonina, Sergei Babkov, Irina Baldina, Nikolai Baskakov, Vsevolod Bazhenov, Yuri Belov, Dmitry Belyaev, Olga Bogaevskaya, Nikolai Galakhov, Ivan Godlevsky, Vladimir Gorb, Abram Grushko, Alexei Eremin, Mikhail Kaneev, Maria Kleschar-Samokhvalova, Maya Kopitseva, Boris Korneev, Alexander Koroviakov, Victor Korovin, Elena Kostenko, Gevork Kotiantz, Mikhail Kozell, Engels Kozlov, Marina Kozlovskaya, Yaroslav Krestovsky, Valeria Larina, Boris Lavrenko, Ivan Lavsky, Anatoli Levitin, Oleg Lomakin, Gavriil Malish, Boris Maluev, Evsey Moiseenko, Nikolai Mukho, Piotr Nazarov, Vera Nazina, Mikhail Natarevich, Yaroslav Nikolaev, Dmitry Oboznenko, Lev Orekhov, Lia Ostrova, Vladimir Ovchinnikov, Sergei Osipov, Genrikh Pavlovsky, Varlen Pen, Nikolai Pozdneev, Stepan Privedentsev, Semion Rotnitsky, Galina Rumiantseva, Ivan Savenko, Gleb Savinov, Alexander Semionov, Arseny Semionov, Nadezhda Shteinmiller, Elena Skuin, Kim Slavin, Alexander Sokolov, Alexander Stolbov, Alexander Tatarenko, Victor Teterin, Nikolai Timkov, Mikhail Trufanov, Yuri Tulin, Boris Ugarov, Ivan Varichev, Anatoli Vasiliev, Valery Vatenin, Rostislav Vovkushevsky, Vecheslav Zagonek, Elena Zhukova, and other important Leningrad artists.
1964 (Leningrad): The Leningrad Fine Arts Exhibition, with Piotr Alberti, Evgenia Antipova, Taisia Afonina, Irina Baldina, Nikolai Baskakov, Evgenia Baykova, Vsevolod Bazhenov, Yuri Belov, Piotr Belousov, Piotr Buchkin, Zlata Bizova, Vladimir Chekalov, Sergei Frolov, Nikolai Galakhov, Vasily Golubev, Tatiana Gorb, Abram Grushko, Alexei Eriomin, Mikhail Kaneev, Yuri Khukhrov, Mikhail Kozell, Marina Kozlovskaya, Tatiana Kopnina, Maya Kopitseva, Boris Korneev, Alexander Koroviakov, Elena Kostenko, Nikolai Kostrov, Anna Kostrova, Gevork Kotiantz, Yaroslav Krestovsky, Valeria Larina, Boris Lavrenko, Ivan Lavsky, Piotr Litvinsky, Oleg Lomakin, Dmitry Maevsky, Gavriil Malish, Evsey Moiseenko, Nikolai Mukho, Piotr Nazarov, Vera Nazina, Mikhail Natarevich, Anatoli Nenartovich, Yuri Neprintsev, Dmitry Oboznenko, Sergei Osipov, Vladimir Ovchinnikov, Nikolai Pozdneev, Alexander Pushnin, Galina Rumiantseva, Ivan Savenko, Gleb Savinov, Vladimir Sakson, Alexander Samokhvalov, Vladimir Seleznev, Arseny Semionov, Alexander Semionov, Yuri Shablikin, Boris Shamanov, Alexander Shmidt, Nadezhda Shteinmiller, Elena Skuin, Galina Smirnova, Alexander Sokolov, Ivan Sorokin, Victor Teterin, Nikolai Timkov, Mikhail Tkachev, Mikhail Trufanov, Yuri Tulin, Vitaly Tulenev, Ivan Varichev, Anatoli Vasiliev, Piotr Vasiliev, Valery Vatenin, Lazar Yazgur, Vecheslav Zagonek, Sergei Zakharov, Ruben Zakharian, and other important Leningrad artists.
1972 (Leningrad): Across the Motherland Exhibition of Leningrad artists dedicated to 50th Anniversary of USSR, with Evgenia Antipova, Nikolai Baskakov, Olga Bogaevskaya, Sergei Frolov, Nikolai Galakhov, Vasily Golubev, Tatiana Gorb, Vladimir Gorb, Irina Dobrekova, Mikhail Kaneev, Mikhail Kozell, Marina Kozlovskaya, Engels Kozlov, Maya Kopitseva, Boris Korneev, Elena Kostenko, Nikolai Kostrov, Anna Kostrova, Gevork Kotiantz, Yaroslav Krestovsky, Ivan Lavsky, Oleg Lomakin, Dmitry Maevsky, Gavriil Malish, Evsey Moiseenko, Piotr Nazarov, Samuil Nevelshtein, Dmitry Oboznenko, Sergei Osipov, Nikolai Pozdneev, Ivan Savenko, Gleb Savinov, Vladimir Sakson, Arseny Semionov, Alexander Sokolov, German Tatarinov, Victor Teterin, Nikolai Timkov, Mikhail Trufanov, Yuri Tulin, Vitaly Tulenev, Ivan Varichev, Igor Veselkin, Valery Vatenin, Vecheslav Zagonek, and other important Leningrad artists.
1975 (Leningrad): Our Contemporary regional exhibition of Leningrad artists of 1975, with Evgenia Antipova, Taisia Afonina, Vsevolod Bazhenov, Irina Baldina, Nikolai Baskakov, Piotr Belousov, Veniamin Borisov, Zlata Bizova, Nikolai Galakhov, Vasily Golubev, Elena Gorokhova, Abram Grushko, Irina Dobrekova, Alexei Eriomin, Mikhail Kaneev, Yuri Khukhrov, Mikhail Kozell, Marina Kozlovskaya, Engels Kozlov, Maya Kopitseva, Boris Korneev, Elena Kostenko, Nikolai Kostrov, Anna Kostrova, Gevork Kotiantz, Vladimir Krantz, Yaroslav Krestovsky, Boris Lavrenko, Oleg Lomakin, Dmitry Maevsky, Gavriil Malish, Evsey Moiseenko, Piotr Nazarov, Vera Nazina, Mikhail Natarevich, Yuri Neprintsev, Samuil Nevelshtein, Dmitry Oboznenko, Sergei Osipov, Vladimir Ovchinnikov, Nikolai Pozdneev, Alexander Pushnin, Galina Rumiantseva, Kapitolina Rumiantseva, Ivan Savenko, Gleb Savinov, Vladimir Sakson, Alexander Samokhvalov, Arseny Semionov, Alexander Semionov, Yuri Shablikin, Boris Shamanov, Alexander Shmidt, Nadezhda Shteinmiller, Elena Skuin, Galina Smirnova, Alexander Stolbov, Victor Teterin, Nikolai Timkov, Leonid Tkachenko, Mikhail Trufanov, Yuri Tulin, Vitaly Tulenev, Ivan Varichev, Anatoli Vasiliev, Igor Veselkin, Valery Vatenin, Lazar Yazgur, Vecheslav Zagonek, and other important Leningrad artists.
1976 (Moscow): The Fine Arts of Leningrad, with Mikhail Avilov, Evgenia Antipova, Nathan Altman, Irina Baldina, Nikolai Baskakov, Yuri Belov, Piotr Belousov, Isaak Brodsky, Piotr Buchkin, Rudolf Frentz, Nikolai Galakhov, Vasily Golubev, Abram Grushko, Alexei Eriomin, Mikhail Kaneev, Engels Kozlov, Marina Kozlovskaya, Maya Kopitseva, Boris Korneev, Elena Kostenko, Nikolai Kostrov, Anna Kostrova, Gevork Kotiantz, Boris Lavrenko, Oleg Lomakin, Alexander Lubimov, Dmitry Maevsky, Gavriil Malish, Evsey Moiseenko, Mikhail Natarevich, Vera Nazina, Yuri Neprintsev, Samuil Nevelshtein, Dmitry Oboznenko, Sergei Osipov, Vladimir Ovchinnikov, Nikolai Pozdneev, Alexander Pushnin, Victor Oreshnikov, Ivan Savenko, Vladimir Sakson, Gleb Savinov, Alexander Samokhvalov, Vladimir Seleznev, Alexander Semionov, Arseny Semionov, Boris Shamanov, Nadezhda Shteinmiller, Elena Skuin, Galina Smirnova, Alexander Sokolov, Victor Teterin, Nikolai Timkov, Mikhail Trufanov, Yuri Tulin, Ivan Varichev, Anatoli Vasiliev, Valery Vatenin, Nina Veselova, Vecheslav Zagonek, Sergei Zakharov, and other important Leningrad artists.
1994 (Saint Petersburg): Etudes done from nature in creativity of the Leningrad School's artists, with Piotr Alberti, Taisia Afonina, Evgenia Antipova, Vsevolod Bazhenov, Irina Baldina, Veniamin Borisov, Zlata Bizova, Vladimir Chekalov, Evgeny Chuprun, Nikolai Galakhov, Tatiana Gorb, Abram Grushko, Irina Dobrekova, Alexei Eriomin, Mikhail Kaneev, Yuri Khukhrov, Mikhail Kozell, Maya Kopitseva, Marina Kozlovskaya, Boris Korneev, Alexander Koroviakov, Elena Kostenko, Piotr Litvinsky, Boris Lavrenko, Ivan Lavsky, Dmitry Maevsky, Alexei Mozhaev, Valentina Monakhova, Nikolai Mukho, Mikhail Natarevich, Alexander Naumov, Anatoli Nenartovich, Dmitry Oboznenko, Lev Orekhov, Sergei Osipov, Vladimir Ovchinnikov, Victor Otiev, Nikolai Pozdneev, Evgeny Pozdniakov, Galina Rumiantseva, Kapitolina Rumiantseva, Lev Russov, Alexander Samokhvalov, Alexander Semionov, Nadezhda Shteinmiller, German Tatarinov, Nikolai Timkov, Mikhail Tkachev, Leonid Tkachenko, Anatoli Vasiliev, Igor Veselkin, Lazar Yazgur, Vecheslav Zagonek, Ruben Zakharian, and other important Leningrad artists.
 1995 (Saint Petersburg): Lyrical motives in the works of artists of the war generation, with Piotr Alberti, Taisia Afonina, Evgenia Antipova, Vsevolod Bazhenov, Irina Baldina, Veniamin Borisov, Yuri Belov, Piotr Belousov, Piotr Buchkin, Vladimir Chekalov, Evgeny Chuprun, Sergei Frolov, Nikolai Galakhov, Abram Grushko, Mikhail Kaneev, Yuri Khukhrov, Mikhail Kozell, Maya Kopitseva, Marina Kozlovskaya, Boris Korneev, Alexander Koroviakov, Elena Kostenko, Ivan Lavsky, Dmitry Maevsky, Gavriil Malish, Nikolai Mukho, Mikhail Natarevich, Anatoli Nenartovich, Yuri Neprintsev, Samuil Nevelshtein, Lev Orekhov, Sergei Osipov, Vladimir Ovchinnikov, Victor Otiev, Nikolai Pozdneev, Evgeny Pozdniakov, Lev Russov, Galina Rumiantseva, Kapitolina Rumiantseva, Alexander Samokhvalov, Alexander Semionov, Alexander Shmidt, Nadezhda Shteinmiller, Alexander Sokolov, Alexander Tatarenko, German Tatarinov, Victor Teterin, Nikolai Timkov, Mikhail Tkachev, Leonid Tkachenko, Anatoli Vasiliev, Piotr Vasiliev, Igor Veselkin, Rostislav Vovkushevsky, Maria Zubreeva, and other important Leningrad artists.
2013 (Saint Petersburg): Paintings of 1940–1980 by the Artists of the Leningrad School, in ARKA Gallery, with Taisia Afonina, Vsevolod Bazhenov, Alexei Eriomin, Dmitry Maevsky, Gavriil Malish, Samuil Nevelshtein, Sergei Osipov, Vladimir Ovchinnikov, Alexander Semionov, Victor Teterin, Nikolai Timkov, Vitaly Tulenev, and other important Leningrad artists.

Sources 
 Весенняя выставка произведений ленинградских художников 1954 года. Каталог. Л., Изогиз, 1954. С.7.
 Весенняя выставка произведений ленинградских художников 1955 года. Каталог. Л., ЛССХ, 1956. С.7, 27.
 1917–1957. Выставка произведений ленинградских художников. Каталог. Л., Ленинградский художник, 1958. С.8.
 Выставка произведений ленинградских художников 1960 года. Каталог. Л., Художник РСФСР, 1963. С.7.
 Выставка произведений ленинградских художников 1960 года. Каталог. Л., Художник РСФСР, 1961. С.8.
 Выставка произведений ленинградских художников 1961 года. Каталог. — Л: Художник РСФСР, 1964. — с.8.
 Осенняя выставка произведений ленинградских художников 1962 года. Каталог. — Л: Художник РСФСР, 1962. — с.7.
 Ленинград. Зональная выставка 1964 года. Каталог. Л, Художник РСФСР, 1965. C.8.
 Каталог весенней выставки произведений ленинградских художников 1965 года. Л, Художник РСФСР, 1970. C.7.
 Весенняя выставка произведений ленинградских художников 1969 года. Каталог. Л., Художник РСФСР, 1970. C.7.
 Художники народов СССР. Биобиблиографический словарь. Т.1. М., Искусство, 1970. C.165.
 Весенняя выставка произведений ленинградских художников 1971 года. Каталог. — Л: Художник РСФСР, 1972. — с.7.
 По родной стране. Выставка произведений художников Ленинграда. 50 Летию образования СССР посвящается. Каталог. Л., Художник РСФСР, 1974. C.9.
 Каталог выставки одиннадцати ленинградских художников. — Л: Художник РСФСР, 1976.
 Выставка произведений художников-женщин Ленинграда. 1975 год. Л., Художник РСФСР, 1979. C.11.
 Наш современник. Зональная выставка произведений ленинградских художников 1975 года. Каталог. Л., Художник РСФСР, 1980. C.11.
 Изобразительное искусство Ленинграда. Каталог выставки. Л., Художник РСФСР, 1976. C.14.
 Выставка произведений ленинградских художников, посвященная 60-летию Великого Октября. Л., Художник РСФСР, 1982. C.11.
 Справочник членов Союза художников СССР. Том 1. — М: Советский художник, 1979. — с.50.
 Зональная выставка произведений ленинградских художников 1980 года. Каталог. Л., Художник РСФСР, 1983. C.9.
 Петербург — Петроград — Ленинград в произведениях русских и советских художников. Каталог выставки. Л., Художник РСФСР, 1980. С.124.
 Выставки советского изобразительного искусства. Справочник. Том 5. 1954–1958 годы. — М: Советский художник, 1981. — с.10, 25, 126, 142, 281, 385, 420.
 Справочник членов Ленинградской организации Союза художников РСФСР. — Л: Художник РСФСР, 1987. — с.7.
 Выставка произведений 26 ленинградских и московских художников. Каталог. Л., Художник РСФСР, 1990. C.14–15, 47.
 L' École de Leningrad. Catalogue. Paris, Drouot Richelieu. 1990, 11 Juin 1990. Р.136–137.
 Charmes Russes. Catalogue. Paris, Drouot Richelieu. 1991, 15 Mai 1991. Р.64.
 Peinture Russe. Catalogue. Paris, Drouot Richelieu. 1991, 18 Fevrier. Р.7,54–55.
 Peinture Russe. Catalogue. Paris, Drouot Richelieu. 1991, 26 Avril. Р.7,18–19.
 Этюд в творчестве ленинградских художников. Выставка произведений. Каталог. СПб., 1994. С.3.
 Лирика в произведениях художников военного поколения. Выставка произведений. Каталог. СПб., 1995. С.3.
 Петербургские музы. Выставка. Живопись, графика, декоративно-прикладное искусство. — СПб: Мемориальный музей Н. А. Некрасова, 1995.
 Памяти учителя. Выставка петербургских художников — учеников мастерской А. А. Осмеркина. СПб., 1997. С.3,5.
 Связь времен. 1932–1997. Художники — члены Санкт-Петербургского Союза художников России. Каталог выставки. СПб., 1997. С.282.
 Matthew Cullerne Bown. A Dictionary of Twentieth Century Russian And Soviet Painters. 1900 — 1980s. — London: Izomar Limited, 1998.
 Евгения Антипова, Виктор Тетерин. Живопись. Графика. СПб., 1999. С.44.
 Художники круга 11-ти. Из коллекции Николая Кононихина. СПб, 2001. С.3.
 Художники — городу. Выставка к 70-летию Санкт-Петербургского Союза художников. Каталог. — Петрополь, 2003. — с.26, 178.
 Anniversary Directory graduates of Saint Petersburg State Academic Institute of Painting, Sculpture, and Architecture named after Ilya Repin, Russian Academy of Arts. 1915–2005. Saint-Petersburg, Pervotsvet Publishing House, 2007. P.61-62.
 А. В. Данилова. Группа одиннадцати как художественное явление в изобразительном искусстве Ленинграда 1960–1980 годов.//Общество. Среда. Развитие. Научно-теоретический журнал. № 3, 2010. С.160–164.
 Evgenia Antipova. A Midday // 80 years of the Saint Petersburg Union of Artists. The Anniversary Exhibition. Saint Petersburg, 2012. P.212.
 Логвинова Е. Круглый стол по ленинградскому искусству в галерее АРКА // Петербургские искусствоведческие тетради. Вып. 31. СПб, 2014. С.17-26.

External links 

 Evgenia Antipova. Biography and Artworks

1917 births
2009 deaths
People from Toropetsky District
People from Toropetsky Uyezd
20th-century Russian painters
21st-century Russian painters
Socialist realist artists
Russian watercolorists
Members of the Leningrad Union of Artists
Leningrad School artists
Leningrad Secondary Art School alumni
Repin Institute of Arts alumni
20th-century Russian women artists
21st-century Russian women artists
Women watercolorists
Soviet Impressionist painters
Russian Impressionist painters